Field Music (Measure) is the third full-length studio album by indie rock band Field Music. It was released on 15 February 2010. Officially, the album's name is the same as their debut album; the name "Measure", other than being the name of one of the songs, does not appear anywhere on the album's artwork. However, both fans and the band have taken to calling it Measure to distinguish the two. Measure is a double album and is split into two discs. The first disc primarily contains more traditionally-structured songs, including both of the album's singles ("Them That Do Nothing" and "Let's Write a Book"), whilst the second disc is dominated by more experimental tracks including found-sound pieces ("See You Later" and "Louis").

Track listing

Disc one
"In the Mirror" – 4:09
"Them That Do Nothing" – 3:09
"Each Time Is a New Time" – 3:34
"Measure" – 2:59
"Effortlessly" – 3:55
"Clear Water" – 3:16
"Lights Up" – 3:58
"All You'd Ever Need to Say" – 2:37
"Let's Write a Book" – 3:40
"You and I" – 3:15

Disc two
"The Rest Is Noise" – 3:52
"Curves of the Needle" – 3:53
"Choosing Numbers" – 2:06
"The Wheels Are in Place" – 3:03
"First Come the Wish" – 2:29
"Precious Plans" – 2:50
"See You Later" – 2:38
"Something Familiar" – 3:50
"Share the Words" – 3:50
"It's About Time" – 5:08 (approx.)
"Louis" (unlisted hidden track) – 2:47 (approx.)

The last two tracks are separated by a period of silence, bringing the length of the final track to 9:50.

Personnel
Peter Brewis – Field Music
David Brewis – Field Music
Emma Fisk – violins
Jill Blakey – violas
Peter Richardson – cello
John Beattie – cornet
Jennie Redmond – backing vocals on "Something Familiar"
Cath Stephens – backing vocals on "Something Familiar"
Kev Dosdale
Ian Black
Mark Simms 
Peter Gofton
Neil Bassett
Ryan Rapsys
Doug McCombs
Andrew Moore

References

2010 albums
Field Music albums
Memphis Industries albums